Alexander Vasilevsky, Alexei Vasilevski, or variants may refer to:
Aleksandr Vasilevsky (1895–1977), Marshal of the Soviet Union
Alex Vasilevsky (software developer) (1961–2010), co-founder of Virtual Iron
Alexander Vasilevski (ice hockey, born 1975), Ukrainian former NHL ice hockey forward
Alexei Vasilevsky (figure skater) (born 1980), Russian figure skater
Alexei Vasilevsky (ice hockey, born 1993), Russian ice hockey defenceman